Mary of Jesus de León y Delgado, was a Spanish Dominican lay sister, mystic and visionary, known popularly as "La Siervita" (the Little Servant). She lived a life which was austere and simple, and many miracles were attributed to her, as well as levitation, ecstasy, bilocation, the stigmata, clairvoyance and healing, among others.

De León died with a reputation for sanctity and is one of the most revered of the natives of the Canary Islands, together with Peter of Saint Joseph Betancur and José de Anchieta. The cause for her canonization has been submitted to the Holy See for review.

Early life 
De León was born on 23 March 1643, in the town of El Sauzal, located on the island of Tenerife, one of the Spanish Canary Islands, to Andrés de León y Bello and María Delgado y Perera, a humble family of noble origin, although in decline. She was their youngest child, having two sisters and a brother. She was of possible Guanche ancestry.

With the death of De León's father in 1646, poverty overtook the family. Three years later, a couple from mainland Spain, who had relocated to the city of San Cristóbal de La Laguna, where the husband was to practice medicine, had decided that they wanted another child to care for, along with their own child. Her mother, María Delgado, was convinced to give up her daughter by the doctor's wife with the promise of a better life for the child. Two years later, the couple made plans to move to New Spain, with the intention of taking Mary with them. Before this could happen, she was recovered by her birth mother, who had learned of this plan. Delgado, however, died shortly after this, and her daughter was taken in by a good friend of her mother, Inés Pérez, who lived in La Orotava.

When De León was reaching her teenage years, two local women, who had the reputation of leading simple lives, came to her foster mother, with a letter supposedly from the girl's maternal aunt, Catalina Delgado, which said that she and her husband wished to care for the girl, and the bearers should accompany her to their farm. They then took her back to the city of San Cristóbal de La Laguna, where one of them approached a man in a back alley of the city. De León quickly realized that she was in danger and made her escape. She went to her aunt's home, where she was received and cared for by her and her uncle.

Her uncle was a lagoon farmer and wealthy landowner. Living there, De León gradually assisted in the household duties and helped her uncle manage the estate. She would rise at dawn and spend the entire day at work, never showing signs of fatigue. However, she felt drawn to religious life, and eventually declared her intention to enter a monastery as a lay sister, a decision which her aunt and uncle accepted.

Initially De León's guardians wanted her to enter the local monastery of the Poor Clares as the servant of their daughter, a choir nun in that community. She chose, however, to enter the monastery of the nuns of the Dominican Second Order, although she originally wanted to belong to the Order of Discalced Carmelites, as she was very devoted to their foundress, St. Teresa of Jesus. As there had not yet been established any monasteries of the Discalced Carmelite nuns in the Canary Islands, De León entered the Dominican Order.

Entrance to the monastery
In February 1668, De León was admitted to the Dominican Monastery of St. Catherine of Siena in San Cristóbal de La Laguna, located next to the Plaza del Adelantado in the center of the city, as a lay sister. There she was to care for an elderly nun of the community, Sister Jacobina de San Jerónimo Suárez, O.P. From that point on she would live within the monastery walls until her death, having never left the cloister. It was during this time that many miracles were attributed to her. One particular episode was one in which a devotional medal with the image of Our Lady of Solitude which she owned was reassembled spontaneously after having been broken into pieces several days before. Another possible episode of levitation was described by other nuns. As with other mystics, De León experienced ecstasy, during which the emission of light could be seen coming from her face. There were also reports of a marked heat emanating from her body, especially when receiving the Eucharist.

De León had a great friendship with the famous corsair Amaro Rodríguez Felipe, popularly known as the "Amaro Pargo," whose sister was also a lay sister in the monastery and who shared a cell with De León. The privateer claimed to have experienced a great miracle through De León. Pargo recounted that he was assaulted by an individual when he was in Cuba. At the very instant when the attacker would have plunged his dagger into the body of the pirate, the figure of De León appeared, interceding and preventing Pargo's death. This phenomenon, known as ubiquity or bilocation, and associated with many saints, is the capacity to be in two places simultaneously.

De León also had a great friendship with the Franciscan friar and mystic Juan de Jesús, who was her spiritual director and who gave her much counsel in pursuing the spiritual life.

De León died in monastery cloister on 15 February 1731, having lived within its walls for 63 years without leaving. Before her death, she fell into an ecstasy and died keeping a pulse and the pupils of her eyes clear for more than 24 hours. In her side, next to her heart, was found a wound, such as the one which would have been left by the side of Christ. Three years later her body was exhumed and was found incorrupt, whole and flexible. Her palate and tongue were preserved fresh and rosy, and jasmine-scented blood issued from her mouth.

Veneration 
 
De León's incorrupt body is still preserved in the Monastery of St. Catherine, where she lived out her life and died. Every 15 February (the anniversary of her death), her body is placed on public display in a glass-covered coffin, which was donated by the corsair Amaro Pargo, who was present at the exhumation. Because of the large numbers of pilgrims and devotees who desire to see her incorrupt body, the coffin is also displayed on the following Sunday.

A formal inquiry into De León's life for possible canonization was begun in the 19th century, but soon ceased. The cause was reopened in 1992 and has been submitted to the Vatican. It remains pending. Supporters of her cause are dismayed by this lack of progress, despite a document from 1771 which lists 1,251 miracles attributed to her intercession.

Although she has not yet been officially canonized, veneration of Sister Mary of Jesus has become the equivalent in the Canary Islands in cults of Saint Teresa of Jesus in the rest of Spain, Saint Catherine of Siena in Italy and Saint Rose of Lima in Peru and Latin America.

Miracles 
Miracles associated with De León are:

Levitation: The ability to maintain stable suspension in the air, and was described by several nuns of the monastery.
Ecstasy: Is an experience of the divine, to feel the presence of God. La Siervita experienced this miracle several times, even as she lay dying.
Bilocation: The ability to be in two places simultaneously. De León was credited with saving the life of the privateer Amaro Rodríguez through her sudden appearance during an assault on him while he was in Cuba.
Hyperthermia: A remarkable elevation of body temperature and the emission of light from the head or face.
Clairvoyance: The nun came to prophesy her own abduction, a great flood and an eruption of the Teide volcano, among others.
Stigmata: When she died, a wound as if by a lance was found by her heart.
Psychokinesis: Ability to move objects by an invisible force.

See also 
 List of saints of the Canary Islands
 Amaro Rodríguez Felipe

References

Sources

External links 

La Siervita de Dios.
Una casa museo para La Siervita, El Día.
El convento de Santa Catalina expone hoy el cuerpo de la Siervita. El Día.
Congrega miles de devotos en el Monasterio de Santa Catalina.  Odisur.

1643 births
1731 deaths
17th-century Christian mystics
18th-century Christian mystics
People from Tenerife
Dominican Sisters
Dominican mystics
Dominican spirituality
18th-century Spanish nuns
Venerated Catholics
Incorrupt saints
Spanish Servants of God
Stigmatics
Santa Cruz de Tenerife
17th-century Spanish nuns